The William R. Haughton Memorial Pace (formerly known as the Governor Alfred E. Driscoll Pace) is a mile and one-eighth race for Standardbred Free-For-All pacers age four and older run annually at Meadowlands Racetrack in East Rutherford, New Jersey.

Currently, the race is held on the same card at the Meadowlands every third Saturday in July, alongside Stanley Dancer Memorial, Mistletoe Shalee, Dorothy Houghton Memorial, Hambletonian Maturity and Miss Versatility, as well as one of the racetrack's most signature events, the Meadowlands Pace.

Historical race events
First run in 1977, the race was known as the Governor Alfred E. Driscoll Pace in honor of Governor of New Jersey, Alfred E. Driscoll. In 1999 it was renamed in honor of legendary driver/trainer William Robert "Billy" Haughton. 

From inception through 2015 the race was set at a distance of one mile.

On July 16, 2022, Bulldog Hanover made harness racing history by clocking in the fastest pace mile ever, winning the 2022 race with a time of 1:45 4/5.

Records
 Most wins by a driver
 6 – Michel Lachance (1989, 1990, 1997, 2000, 2003, 2004)

 Most wins by a trainer
 3 – Joe Holloway (1984, 1985, 1986) & Virgil Morgan, Jr. (2007, 2008, 2013)

 Stakes record at 1 1/8 miles
 2:01 1/5 – Always B Miki (2016; world record)

 Stakes record at 1 mile
 1:45 4/5 – Bulldog Hanover (2022; fastest mile in harness racing history)

William R. Haughton Memorial winners

1.2020: Raced to full completion amid low attendance due to the COVID-19 pandemic.

References

Meadowlands Racetrack
Recurring sporting events established in 1977
Harness racing in the United States
Horse races in New Jersey
Sports in East Rutherford, New Jersey
1977 establishments in New Jersey